Padma Raghavan is a computer scientist who works as vice provost for research at Vanderbilt University.

Raghavan graduated in 1985 from the Indian Institute of Technology Kharagpur.
She earned her Ph.D. from Pennsylvania State University in 1991, with a dissertation on parallel algorithms for matrix decomposition supervised by Alex Pothen. She worked at the University of Tennessee and Oak Ridge National Laboratory, then returned as a faculty member to Penn State in 2000. At Penn State, she became a distinguished professor of computer science and engineering, associate vice president for research, and director of strategic initiatives. She moved to Vanderbilt as vice provost in 2016.

In 2002, Raghavan won a Maria Goeppert Mayer Distinguished Scholar award, funding her to visit Argonne National Laboratory. She was a Computing Research Association CRA-W Distinguished Lecturer in 2010. She became a fellow of the IEEE in 2013. She was elected to the 2022 class of Fellows of the American Association for the Advancement of Science (AAAS).

Raghavan's husband, mathematician Steve Simpson, moved with her from Penn State to Vanderbilt.

References

External links

Year of birth missing (living people)
Living people
American computer scientists
Indian computer scientists
Indian women computer scientists
IIT Kharagpur alumni
Pennsylvania State University alumni
University of Tennessee faculty
Pennsylvania State University faculty
Vanderbilt University faculty
Fellow Members of the IEEE